The 1986 U.S. Figure Skating Championships was held in early February 1986 in Uniondale, New York. Medals were awarded in four colors: gold (first), silver (second), bronze (third), and pewter (fourth) in four disciplines – men's singles, ladies' singles, pair skating, and ice dancing – across three levels: senior, junior, and novice.

The event was one of the criteria used to select the U.S. teams for the 1986 World Championships.

Senior results

Men

Ladies

Pairs
Shelly Propson and Jerod Swallow withdrew after she fell on her head during a lift in a practice session on February 6.

Ice dancing

Junior results

Men

Ladies

Pairs

Ice dancing

Novice results

Men

Ladies

Pairs

Ice dancing

References

External links
 Ladies' results
 Pairs' results

U.S. Figure Skating Championships
United States Figure Skating Championships, 1986
United States Figure Skating Championships, 1986
February 1986 sports events in the United States